Indonesia is divided into provinces. Provinces are made up of regencies (kabupaten) and cities (kota). Provinces, regencies, and cities have their own local governments and parliamentary bodies.

Since the enactment of Law Number 22 of 1999 on Local Government (the law was revised by Law Number 32 of 2004 and Law Number 23 of 2014), local governments now play a greater role in administering their areas. Foreign policy, defence (including armed forces and national police), system of law, and monetary policy, however, remain the domain of the national government. Since 2005 as the enactment of Law Number 32 of 2004, heads of local government (governors, regents and mayors) have been directly elected by popular election.

First level

First level subdivisions of Indonesia is Province. A province is headed by a governor (Gubernur). Each province has its own regional assembly, called Dewan Perwakilan Rakyat Daerah (DPRD, literally "Regional People's Representative Council"). Governors and representative members are elected by popular vote for five-year terms.

Indonesia is divided into 38 provinces. Nine provinces have special status:

 Jakarta Special Capital Region: Jakarta is the capital of Indonesia. The Governor of Jakarta has the power to appoint and dismiss mayors and regent within the region. The local government is allowed to co-operate with other cities from other countries.
 Aceh: Aceh has greater role in local government, which includes its own Islamic Sharia law (for Muslim citizens), flag and provincial anthem, local political parties are allowed, and decisions or laws made by the central government which directly affect Aceh's administration must be referred to the local government or legislative body.
 Yogyakarta Special Region: The Sultan of Yogyakarta is de facto and de jure governor of Yogyakarta since he is given priority when electing the governor. For centuries, the Sultanate of Yogyakarta has reigned in the region. However, in the 2000s the central government proposed a law that required the governor to be popularly elected as in the other provinces, while still giving the sultan significant political power. Since 31 August 2012, the Law Number 13 of 2012 on Specialty of Yogyakarta Special Region has been approved by the central government and according to the act, Yogyakarta refuses to be a province but a region at province-level. Within the Special Region of Yogyakarta is also the Principality of Pakualaman. The Prince of Pakualaman is also a hereditary position, and serve as the Vice-Governor of Yogyakarta.
 Papua: Since 2001 local government has a greater role. The governor is required to be of Papuan origins.
 Central Papua: The Province split from Papua in 2022.
 Highland Papua: The Province split from Papua in 2022. This province is the only landlocked province in Indonesia.
 South Papua: The Province split from Papua in 2022.
 West Papua: The province split from Papua in 2003. A 2008 regulation by the national government confirms that special autonomy status in Papua also applies to West Papua.
 Southwest Papua: The Province split from West Papua in 2022.

Second level

Second level subdivisions of Indonesia is Regency and city.This subdivisions is a local level of government beneath the provincial level. However, they enjoy greater decentralisation of affairs than the provincial body, such as provision of public schools and public health facilities.

Both regency and city are at the same level, having their own local government and legislative body. The difference between a regency and a city lies in differing demographics, size and economics.

Generally the regency has a larger area than the city, and the city has non-agricultural economic activities. A regency is headed by a regent, and a city is headed by a mayor. The regent or mayor and the representative council members are elected by popular vote for a term of 5 years.

Third level

Regencies and cities are divided into districts, which have several variations of terms:
 Kecamatan headed by a camat. A camat is a civil servant, responsible to the regent (in a regency) or to the mayor (in a city). Kecamatan are found in most parts of Indonesia.
 Distrik headed by a kepala distrik, are used in provinces within Western New Guinea.
 In the Special Region of Yogyakarta, kapanewon (for subdivisions of regencies), headed by a panewu, and kemantren (for subdivisions of Yogyakarta City), headed by a mantri pamong praja, are used.

Fourth level

Districts are divided into desa (villages) or kelurahan (urban communities). Both desa and kelurahan are of a similar division level, but a desa enjoys more power in local matters than a kelurahan. An exception is Aceh, where districts are divided into mukim before being subdivided further into gampong.

Desa
In Indonesian, as in English, a village (desa) has rural connotations. In the context of administrative divisions, a desa can be defined as a body which has authority over the local people in accordance with acknowledged local traditions of the area. A desa is headed by a "head of village", who is elected by popular vote.

Most Indonesian villages use the term "desa", but other terms are used in some regions:
 Gampong in Aceh
 Nagari in West Sumatra (except Mentawai Islands Regency)
 Dusun in Bungo Regency (Jambi)
 Kampung in some places in Indonesia:
 Lampung (in Central Lampung, Mesuji, Tulang Bawang, Way Kanan, and West Tulangbawang regencies)
 East Kalimantan (in Berau and West Kutai regencies)
 Provinces in Western New Guinea
 Pekon in Pringsewu, Tanggamus, and West Lampung regencies (Lampung)
 In Bali, there are two forms of "desa", i.e. desa dinas (service village) and desa adat (cultural village). Desa dinas deals with administrative functions, while desa adat deals with religious and cultural functions.
 Lembang in Toraja and North Toraja regencies (South Sulawesi)
 Kalurahan in Special Region of Yogyakarta.

Notes
 In other places, "dusun" is an administrative division form below "desa".
 In other places, "kampung" is equal with "dusun", except in Bungo, Jambi.

Kelurahan
Although desa and kelurahan are part of a district, a kelurahan has less autonomy than a desa. A kelurahan is headed by a lurah. Lurahs are civil servants, directly responsible to their camats.

Statistics
The following table lists the number of current provinces, regencies, and cities in Indonesia.

See also

 List of Indonesian floral emblems
 Provinces of Indonesia

References

 
Indonesia
Indonesia